Welington Reginaldo "Nezinho" dos Santos, also commonly known simply as Nezinho (born 21 January 1981 in Araraquara) is a Brazilian professional basketball player. He also represented the senior Brazilian national team. At a height of 1.85 m (6'1") tall, he plays at the point guard position.

Professional career
Dos Santos was the Brazilian League's Sixth Man of the Year in 2010.

National team career
Dos Santos was a member of the senior Brazilian national basketball team. With Brazil, he played at some of the following major tournaments: the 2005 FIBA AmeriCup, the 2006 FIBA World Cup, the 2007 FIBA AmeriCup, the 2010 FIBA World Cup, and the 2011 FIBA AmeriCup.

References

External links
FIBA Profile
Latinbasket.com Profile
New Basket Brazil Profile 

1981 births
Living people
2006 FIBA World Championship players
2010 FIBA World Championship players
Associação Limeirense de Basquete players
Basketball players at the 2011 Pan American Games
Brazilian men's basketball players
CR Vasco da Gama basketball players
Novo Basquete Brasil players
Pan American Games competitors for Brazil
People from Araraquara
Point guards
UniCEUB/BRB players
Franca Basquetebol Clube players
Sportspeople from São Paulo (state)